The uninhabited Knight Islands are members of the Arctic Archipelago in the territory of Nunavut. They are located in Gray Strait, an arm of the Labrador Sea. The Knight Islands measure .

References 

Islands of the Labrador Sea
Uninhabited islands of Qikiqtaaluk Region